The Modern American School is an American private international, co-educational school based in Amman, Jordan. Founded in 1986, the school provides primary, middle, and secondary education for students from 3 to 18 years. The school is made up of students from over 52 different nationalities including Jordanians, other Arabs, and Non-Arab nationalities; approximately 30% of the staff being non-Jordanian from over 27 different countries. 

Graduates of the school have gone on to attend Harvard University, Yale University, University of Pennsylvania, Massachusetts Institute of Technology, University of Glasgow, London School of Economics, University of Toronto, and the Heidelberg University as well as other pursuits.

History

The Modern American School (previously Modern Education School (مدارس التربية الحديثة)) was established in 1986 as a private co-ed day school for grades Kindergarten through 6th, later expanding to include grades 7th through 12th. It began offering international studies in 1996 and was licensed to teach IGCSE and Edexcel GCE Programs in 1997. The school became licensed to teach the American Diploma Program in 2003 and became an AP examination center in 2008, allowing the College Board to administer the college SAT admissions test. It uses the American Common Core Standard for its curriculum and course progression.

The Modern American School is an IB World School and offers the International Baccalaureate Diploma Programme.

Facilities and curriculum

The curriculum of the Modern American School includes teaching students about technology and providing them with instruction on the use of iPads, laptop computers, and eBooks. It also has a community outreach program where students have engaged in a number of local activities such as fundraising and community service. It is also a Model United Nations school that teaches curriculum on research, public speaking, debating, and writing skills as well as diplomacy, international relations and the United Nations, with students attending international conferences in New York United Nations, Harvard University MUN, and Yale MUN.

The Modern American School is based in Amman and accommodates approximately 1,000 students. It occupies two buildings near the Ukrainian embassy and includes an auditorium, two gymnasiums, football fields, computer centers, cafeterias, music room, outdoor playgrounds and arts and crafts room.

See also

 Education in Jordan
 History of Jordan
 Index of Jordan-related articles
 List of schools in Jordan

References

External links
 
 Kia sponsors Modern American School Tournament
 Talents emerge in the 'music room'

1986 establishments in Jordan
Elementary and primary schools in Jordan
High schools and secondary schools in Jordan
American international schools in Jordan
Educational institutions established in 1986
Private schools in Jordan
Schools in Amman
International Baccalaureate schools in Jordan